Albu Naim (also Romanized as Ālbū Na‘īm, Al Bowna‘īm, Ālbū Na‘ayyem, Al Būna‘īm, and Āl-e Bū Na‘īm) is a village in Hoseyni Rural District, in the Central District of Shadegan County, Khuzestan Province, Iran. At the 2006 census, its population was 259, in 44 families.

References 

Populated places in Shadegan County